Llansannan is a rural village and community in Conwy County Borough, Wales. The population was 1,291 in 2001, with 67% able to speak Welsh. The figures for the 2011 census were: population 1,335 with 63% able to speak Welsh.
The community includes the hamlets of Bylchau, Rhydgaled and Y Groes, and the lake Llyn Aled and reservoir Aled Isaf on Mynydd Hiraethog. Llansannan is in the traditional county of Denbighshire.

Amenities

The village contains the Red Lion Inn and Ysgol Bro Aled primary school.

A village landmark is the statue of the "Little Girl" that commemorates notable figures from the area.  The work of William Goscombe John, the statue was officially unveiled in 1899, shortly after the death of local politician T. E. Ellis, whose brainchild it had been.

The parish church of St Sannan is a grade II* listed building. Founded by the Irish bishop, St Sannan, it was first mentioned in 1254 and restored in 1878/9. None of the medieval features survived the restoration.

Governance
A Llansannan electoral ward exists, which stretches beyond the confines of Llansannan community to include neighbouring Llannefydd. It had a total population taken at the 2011 census of 1,925.

Llansannan and Bylchau also elect community councillors to represent them on Llansannan Community Council.

Sport
Clwb Pêl-droed Llansannan (Llansannan Football Club) compete in Vale of Clwyd and Conwy Football League.

Notable residents
 Tudur Aled – late medieval Welsh poet.
Tara Bethan – actress in Rownd a Rownd and theatrical performer.
Sir William Mars-Jones – High Court judge
William Rees – usually known by his bardic name of Gwilym Hiraethog, was a Welsh poet and author, one of the major figures of Welsh literature during the 19th century.
 William Salesbury – leading scholar of the Renaissance and the principal translator of the 1567 Welsh New Testament.
Orig Williams – wrestler known as El Bandito

References

External links 

 A Vision of Britain Through Time
 British Listed Buildings
 Genuki
 Geograph
 Llansannan Community Council
 Office for National Statistics